Melananthus is a genus of flowering plants belonging to the family Solanaceae.

Its native range is Southern Mexico to Tropical America.

Species:

Melananthus cubensis 
Melananthus fasciculatus 
Melananthus guatemalensis 
Melananthus multiflorus 
Melananthus ulei

References

Solanaceae
Solanaceae genera